Singles is the fourth studio album by American synthpop band Future Islands, released on March 24, 2014 through 4AD Records. The album's lead single "Seasons (Waiting on You)" was picked as the best track of 2014 by NME, Pitchfork Media and Spin.

Critical reception

Singles received acclaim from contemporary music critics. At Metacritic, which assigns a normalized rating out of 100 to reviews from mainstream critics, the album received an average score of 82, based on 32 reviews, which indicates "universal acclaim".

Track listing

Charts

Certifications

References

2014 albums
Future Islands albums
4AD albums
Albums produced by Chris Coady